The name Otto was used for three tropical cyclones in the Atlantic Ocean and for one each in Europe, the Western Pacific Ocean and Australian region.

In the Atlantic
 Tropical Storm Otto (2004), remained far from land
 Hurricane Otto (2010), brought heavy rain to the northeastern Caribbean before moving out into the Atlantic Ocean 
 Hurricane Otto (2016), made landfall in Nicaragua as a Category 3 hurricane, bringing torrential rainfall to Central America; later emerged into the Eastern Pacific Ocean as a tropical storm and then dissipated.
The name Otto was retired from future use in the Atlantic after the 2016 season and was replaced with Owen for the 2022 season.

In Europe
 Storm Otto (2023), part of the 2022–23 European windstorm season

In the Western Pacific
Typhoon Otto (1998) (T9802, 04W, Bising) - Latest first typhoon of a season on record.

In the Australian region
 Cyclone Otto (1977), made landfall near Queensland in March 1977.

References

Atlantic hurricane set index articles
Pacific typhoon set index articles
Pacific hurricane set index articles